Arthur Philip Perceval (1799–1853) was an English high church Anglican cleric, royal chaplain and theological writer.

Life

Born on 22 November 1799, he was the fifth and youngest son of Charles George Perceval, 2nd Baron Arden, by his wife Margaret Elizabeth, eldest daughter of Sir Thomas Spencer Wilson. He matriculated at Oriel College, Oxford, on 19 March 1817, graduating B.A. in 1820 and B.C.L. in 1824; from 1821 to 1825 he was fellow of All Souls College.

On 18 June 1824 he was appointed rector of East Horsley, Surrey. In 1826 he became chaplain to George IV, and continued royal chaplain to William IV and Queen Victoria until his death. He supported the Tractarian movement at Oxford, and in 1841 published a Vindication of the Authors of the Tracts for the Times, principally defending John Henry Newman against attacks made on his Tract 90. On 24 July 1838, when preaching as royal chaplain at the Chapel Royal, St. James's, he advocated High Church principles before the queen. Charles Blomfield, bishop of London, who was aware of Perceval's intention, is said to have preached for several Sundays in order to keep Perceval out of the pulpit, but the bishop broke his collarbone, and Perceval found his opportunity.

Perceval died on 11 June 1853, having married, on 15 December 1825, Charlotte Anne, eldest daughter of the Rev. and Hon. Augustus George Legge, fifth son of William Legge, 2nd Earl of Dartmouth; she died on 21 June 1856, having had, with other issue, three sons and four daughters.

Works
Perceval was a voluminous author, mostly of letters, sermons, and pamphlets. His works include:
 A Christian Peace-Offering; Being an Endeavour to Abate the Asperities of the Controversy between the Roman and English Catholic Churches 1829
 Reasons Why I Am Not a Member of the Bible Society, 1830
 Letter to the Reverend James Slade, Containing Remarks on His Letter to the Lord Bishop of London, on the Subject of Church Reform, 1831
 A Letter to Lord Henley Respecting His Publication on Church Reform, 1832
 A Letter to the Right Honourable Earl Grey, on the Obligation of the Coronation Oath, 1832
 On the Expected Dissolution of Parliament: An Address to the Members of the Church of England Entitled to Vote for Members of Parliament, 1833
High Christian Principle the Only Safeguard, and the Church of Christ Invulnerable: A Sermon Preached in the Chapel Royal, St. James's, 1833
 An Address to the Deans and Chapters of the Cathedral Churches in England and Wales, on the Election of Bishops: to Which is Prefixed, a Prayer for the Orthodox Catholics, while their Church is Under Persecution, 1833
 A Clergyman's Defence of Himself, for Refusing to Use the Office for the Burial of the Dead over One Who Destroyed Himself, Notwithstanding the Coroner's Verdict of Mental Derangement, 1833
Observations on the Proposed Alterations, and Present System, of the Society for Promoting Christian Knowledge, with Suggestions for Its Improvement, 1834
 Historical Notices Concerning Some of the Peculiar Tenets of the Church of Rome, 1836
 Reasons for Withdrawing the Clergy Remonstrance, 1839
 The Roman Schism illustrated from the Records of the Catholic Church, 1836
 The Origin of Church Rates, 1837
 The Christian Priesthood, and the Church of England, 1838
 The Original Services for the State Holidays, 1838
 Sermons preached chiefly at the Chapel Royal, St. James's, 1839
 Questions and Answers on Christian Baptism, 1841
 An Apology for the Doctrine of Apostolical Succession, 1839; 2nd edit. 1841
 A Vindication of the Principles of the Authors of "The Tracts for the Times" 1841
 A Collection of Papers connected with the Theological Movement of 1833, 1842; 2nd edit. 1843
 On Subscription to the XXXIX Articles, 1842
 A Vindication of the Proceedings Relative to the Mission of Bishop Alexander to Jerusalem, 1843
 On the Use of the Irish Language in Religious Worship and Instruction (1844)
 Plain Lectures on the Gospel According to St. Matthew, 1845
 Three Sermons Preached in Times of Public Anxiety, 1845
 Results of an Ecclesiastical Tour in Holland and Northern Germany, 1846.
 Plain Lectures on the Epistle of Paul the Apostle to the Ephesians, 1846
 A Letter to Lord John Russell, on National Education, 1847
 A Question for the Present Crisis: Who Are the Queen's Constitutional Advisers?, 1848
 A Letter to the Members of the Peace Society, 1849
 Origines Hibernicæ, Dublin, 1849 (in this he endeavours to prove that Ireland is the Patmos of Revelation, and that the Virgin Mary was buried on Tara Hill)
 A Letter to the Bishop of Exeter, with Remarks on the Resolutions of the Archdeacon of Chichester, and a Note on Dr. Wiseman, 1850
 Result of a First Endeavour to Re-establish, in Germany, the Ancient Ecclesiastical Missions from England and Ireland, in 1846-1847, 1850
 The Use of Lights on the Communion Table in the Day Time, 1851
On the Use of the Crucifix, 1851
 Thoughts on the Delayed Interment of the Remains of the Late Duke of Wellington, 1852

External links
Bibliographic directory from Project Canterbury

Attribution

1799 births
1853 deaths
19th-century English Anglican priests
Alumni of Oriel College, Oxford
Fellows of All Souls College, Oxford